Aleksandr Neumyvakin (1 May 1940 – 9 December 2021) was a Russian politician. A member of the Communist Party, he served on the Congress of People's Deputies of the Soviet Union from 1989 to 1991.

References

1940 births
2021 deaths
20th-century Russian politicians
Communist Party of the Soviet Union members
Members of the Congress of People's Deputies of the Soviet Union
People from Liskinsky District